Born to Battle is a 1926 American silent Western film directed by Robert De Lacey and starring Tom Tyler, Jean Arthur and Frankie Darro. Tyler also starred in the 1935 film of the same name, but that western film has a different plot and is unrelated to the 1926 film.

Plot
As described in a film magazine review, Denny Terhune, known as "Irish" and foreman of the Morgan ranch, is feared by Manager Daley and his henchman. They know that there is oil on the ranch property and are plotting to gain control of it. They ship Denny away and have him shanghaied, but he excapes and comes back. He meets Morgan's daughter Eunice, but she looks at him as being a roughneck. Finally, Denny defeats the plans of the conspirators, beats them up, and convinces Eunice that he would be the ideal husband for her after all.

Cast
 Tom Tyler as Dennis Terhune 
 Jean Arthur as Eunice Morgan
 Ray Childs as Moxley 
 Fred Gamble as Morgan 
 Frankie Darro as Birdie 
 Buck Black as Tuffy 
 LeRoy Mason as Daley
 Ethan Laidlaw as Trube
 Nora Cecil (uncredited)

References

External links
 

1926 films
1926 Western (genre) films
Films directed by Robert De Lacey
American black-and-white films
Film Booking Offices of America films
Silent American Western (genre) films
1920s English-language films
1920s American films